His Double Life is a 1933 American pre-Code comedy-drama film directed by Broadway theatrical impresario and first time film director Arthur Hopkins with directorial input from the experienced William C. deMille, Cecil's older brother. It stars Roland Young and Lillian Gish.

It had been filmed before in 1921 in the silent era as The Great Adventure with Lionel Barrymore, and was remade again in 1943 as Holy Matrimony with Monty Woolley. It is preserved at the Library of Congress, Washington D.C. and is available on DVD. This film is now in public domain (in the USA).

Plot
Priam Farrel is England's most renowned painter. A recluse who hates fame, he has been away from England; his longtime agent has never even met him. When Lady Helen mistakenly believes he has proposed to her, he hastily returns to London with his valet Henry Leek. After Leek dies soon after of pneumonia, the attending doctor mistakes him for Priam and informs the press. The real Priam is glad to be mistaken for his valet by everyone, even his cousin Duncan (who has not seen him since he was 12). After several attempts to clear up the misidentification, he gives up.

He goes to a hotel, where he meets Alice Chalice, who was put in touch with Leek through The Matrimonial Times and, by chance, was to meet Leek for the first time there. Leek had sent her a photograph of him and Priam together, so she makes the same mistake. Priam finds her very pleasant to be with. He has qualms when he learns that "he" is to be accorded the great honor of being interred in Westminster Abbey, but once again he is unable to convince anyone, including Alice, that he is the painter.

He is happy to marry Alice and live a quiet country life. Then Alice's income from brewery shares disappears, along with the brewery, but Priam assures her that he can provide for her by selling some of his paintings. She is skeptical, however. Nonetheless, she sells some of his paintings, mainly for the frames. One painting passes through several hands and ends up with Oxford, Priam's old agent, who recognizes the artist's style. Oxford buys all of Priam's new paintings and resells them, guaranteeing that they are genuine Farrels.

Oxford tracks Priam down and asks him to reveal he is still alive. It turns out that one of the paintings Oxford sold had a date on the back, 1932, two years after Priam's "death", and the buyer has taken Oxford to court. Priam strenuously refuses, so Oxford takes another approach, placing an advertisement asking for information about Henry Leek.

Leek's widow shows up, accompanied by her clergymen sons John and Henry. Her husband deserted her about 25 years before after the birth of their twin sons. She identifies Priam as him. Priam bolts at the first opportunity, but Alice is more than up to the challenge. She portrays her "Henry" as violent and not entirely sane and points out that there would be a scandal. The Leeks hastily depart.

Even so, Priam is brought into court. In the course of testimony, his cousin Duncan recalls that he has two moles on his neck. Priam stubbornly refuses to show them, but Alice convinces him to do so. Afterward, Priam and Alice sail away to recover their privacy.

Cast
 Roland Young as Priam Farrel
 Lillian Gish as Alice Hunter
 Montagu Love as Duncan Farrel
 Lumsden Hare as Oxford
 Lucy Beaumont as Mrs. Leek
 Charles Richman as Witt
 Oliver Smith as Leek Twin - John
 Philip Tonge as Leek Twin - Henry
 Audrey Ridgewell as Lady Helen  
 Regina DeValet as Mary 
 Charles Halton as Newsman on Phone (uncredited)
 Roland Hogue as Henry Leek (uncredited)

Reception
Mordaunt Hall, critic for The New York Times, described the film as "a highly intelligent type of comedy, one that arouses amusement rather than loud laughter."

Soundtrack
"Someday, Sometime, Somewhere" and "Springtime in Old Granada", written by James F. Hanley and Karl Stark

See also
 Lillian Gish filmography

References

External links

1933 films
1933 comedy-drama films
American black-and-white films
American comedy-drama films
Films about fictional painters
Films based on British novels
American films based on plays
Films based on works by Arnold Bennett
Films directed by William C. deMille
Films set in London
Paramount Pictures films
1930s English-language films
1930s American films